The 1919 Nevada Sagebrushers football team was an American football team that represented the University of Nevada as an independent during the 1919 college football season. In their first season under head coach Ray Courtright, the team compiled an 8–1–1 record, shut out seven of ten opponents, and outscored all opponents by a total of 449 to 32.

Schedule

References

Nevada
Nevada Wolf Pack football seasons
Nevada Sagebrushers football